Strange, Le Strange or le Strange is a surname. It may refer to:

People
Adario Strange, American writer, editor, film director and artist
Alan Strange (1906–1994), American Major League Baseball player
Albert Strange (1855–1917), artist and yacht designer
Alexander Strange (1818–1876), British Indian Army officer, took part in the Great Trigonometrical Survey of India
Alfred Strange (1900–1978), English footballer
Allen Strange (1943–2008), American composer
Barry Strange, Australian rules footballer in the 1950s and '60s
Billy Strange (1930-2012), American musician
Charles Strange (1909–1992), Canadian politician
Cole Strange (born 1998), American football player
Curtis Strange (born 1955), American golfer
Cy Strange (1915–1987), Canadian radio broadcaster
David Strange, English cellist and professor
Dee Strange-Gordon (born 1988), American baseball player
Doug Strange (born 1964), former Major League Baseball player
Edmund Strange (1871–1925), English footballer
Frederick Strange (–1854) English natural history collector, active until death in Australia.
Frederick William Strange (1844–1897), English-born physician, surgeon and politician in Ontario, Canada
Frederick William Strange (rower) (1853–1889), Englishman who promoted competitive outdoor sports in Japan
Glenn Strange (1899–1973), American actor
Graham Strange (born 1968), Bermudian cricketer
Guy Le Strange (1854–1933), British Orientalist
Helena Pedersdatter Strange (c. 1200–1255), queen consort of Sweden, spouse of King Canute II
Ian Strange (British artist) (1934–2018), British-born Falkland Islands writer and naturalist
James Charles Stuart Strange (1753–1840), British officer and trader
James F. Strange (1872–1926), American politician
Jason Strange (born 1973), Welsh rugby union player
John Strange (disambiguation), a list of people named John or Johnny
Llewellyn Strange (1892–1973), a police chief and politician in Newfoundland
Louis Strange (1891–1966), English aviator in both world wars
Luther Strange (born 1953), 49th Attorney General of Alabama and United States Senator
Maxwell W. Strange (1820–1880), Ontario lawyer and political figure
Michael Strange (boxer) (born 1970), Canadian retired boxer
Hidenokuni Hajime, English-born sumo wrestler born Nathan John Strange in 1971
Orlando Strange (1826–1906), physician and politician in Ontario, brother of Maxwell
Pat Strange (born 1980), American former baseball pitcher
Pete Strange (1938–2004), English jazz trombonist
Philip Strange (1884–1963), British actor
Raymond Strange (1878–1962), New Zealand cricketer
Richard Strange (born 1951), English writer, actor, musician, curator, teacher, adventurer and founder and front man of the band Doctors of Madness
Richard Strange (Jesuit) (1611–1683), English Jesuit
Richard Strange (MP for Hereford), Member of Parliament
Robert Strange (disambiguation)
Sarah Strange (born 1974), Canadian actress
Scott Strange (born 1977), Australian golfer
Sharan Strange (born 1959), American poet
Steve Strange (1959–2015), Welsh pop singer, member of the band Visage
Susan Strange (1923–1998), British political economist
Terence Strange, English cricketer up to 1970
Thomas Strange (disambiguation)
Todd Strange (born 1966), bassist
Todd Strange (politician), 56th mayor of Montgomery, Alabama (2009–2019)
William Alder Strange (1813-1874), headmaster of Abingdon School

Fictional characters
Doctor Strange, a Marvel comics character
Adam Strange, a DC comics character
Hugo Strange, a DC comics character
Chief Superintendent Strange, a senior police officer in the television series Inspector Morse
Jonathan Strange, a magician

See also
 Clan Strange
 Strang
 L'Estrange, a list of people with the surname L'Estrange, Lestrange, Le Strange, and minor variations thereof